is the second full-length album by Animetal the Second, a solo project by anonymous female singer Queen.M. Released through Gr8! Records on 6 April 2016, the album includes the original song "Fallen Angel", written by Loudness lead vocalist Minoru Niihara. It also features guest performances by Loudness members Akira Takasaki and Masayoshi Yamashita, ex-Anthem drummer Hirotsugu Homma, Skid Row guitarist Scotti Hill, Mr. Big guitarist Paul Gilbert, Seikima-II guitarist Luke Takamura, Mary's Blood guitarist Saki, and The Winery Dogs vocalist/guitarist Richie Kotzen.

The album peaked at No. 140 on Oricon's weekly albums chart.

Track listing
All tracks are arranged by Yoichi Tanoue, except track 1 by Shigeru Sakura and Tanoue, track 7 by F.A.B., and track 9 by Naoki Endō.

Personnel
Queen.M – Lead vocals
Z.Z.T. – All instruments (except where indicated)

with

Yoichi Tanoue – Guitar (2, 7, 11)
Saki – Guitar (2, 10)
Scotti Hill – Guitar (3)
Paul Gilbert – Guitar (4)
Luke Takamura – Guitar (5)
Toru Meki – Guitar (6)
Richie Kotzen – Guitar (8)
Masayoshi Yamashita – Bass (2–3)
Mr. Crowley – Bass (4, 7–8)
Tatsuhiro Yoshida – Bass (6)
Hirotsugu Homma – Drums (2–3)
Jumping Frog – all instruments (9)
Kohta Yoshizawa – Chorus (11)

Charts

References

External links

2016 albums
Animetal albums
Japanese-language albums
Covers albums
Sony Music Entertainment Japan albums